Bernard Powszuk (born 2 March 1994) is a Polish professional footballer who plays as a defender for Grom Nowy Staw.

Senior career

Powszuk began his career with Lechia Gdańsk. At Lechia he played a total of over 50 games for the second team, but failed to make an appearance for the Lechia first team. On 1 January 2016 he moved to Concordia Elbląg, with the intention of keeping Concordia in the division. After only being in the starting side for six months, he made a move to GKS Przodkowo before moving on to join KP Starogard Gdański in 2018.

References

1994 births
Living people
Polish footballers
Association football defenders
Lechia Gdańsk players
Lechia Gdańsk II players
III liga players
IV liga players
Poland youth international footballers